Jari Viitala (born December 1, 1958) is a Finnish professional ice hockey player. He was selected by the Colorado Rockies in the 12th round (190th overall) of the 1978 NHL Amateur Draft. He represented Finland at the 1978 World Junior Ice Hockey Championships.

Viitala made his SM-liiga debut playing with Ilves during the 1977–78. He played parts of nine season and 304 regular-season games with Ives before retiring after the 1987–88 SM-liiga season.

References

External links

1958 births
Living people
Ice hockey people from Tampere
Bellingham Blazers players
New Westminster Bruins players
Colorado Rockies (NHL) draft picks
Finnish ice hockey forwards
Ilves players
Finnish expatriate ice hockey players in Canada
Finnish expatriate ice hockey players in the United States